Cristin Joy Alexander (born c. 1987) is a beauty pageant titleholder who was crowned Miss Cayman Islands 2010. She represented Cayman Islands at  Miss Universe 2011 and Miss World 2010.

Miss Cayman Islands 2010
She won the Best Legs award. Alexander was crowned the winner of the title, gaining the right to represent the Cayman Islands in the 2010 Miss World and the 2011 Miss Universe pageants.

References

External links 
 Official Miss Cayman Islands website

1980s births
Date of birth missing (living people)
Living people
Caymanian beauty pageant winners
Miss Universe 2011 contestants
Miss World 2010 delegates
Caymanian models